60 Hz is a frequency that may refer to:

 the utility frequency (power line frequency) in the Americas and parts of Asia 
 the frame rate of video broadcasts in the Americas and parts of Asia

See also
 Interlaced video
 Mains hum